The 2007 Middlesbrough Borough Council took place on Thursday 3 May 2007 to elect all 48 councillors, across 23 multi-member wards. to Middlesbrough Borough Council. The Labour Party retained a majority on the council.

Overall results

A total of   valid votes were cast and there were    rejected ballots.
The turnout was %.

Council Composition
After the election the composition of the council was:

Con - Conservative Party
L - Liberal Democrats
MI - Middlesbrough Independents

Results by ward

Acklam Ward

Ayresome Ward

Beckfield Ward

Beechwood Ward

Brookfield Ward

Clairville Ward

Coulby Newham Ward

Gresham Ward

Hemlington Ward

Kader Ward

Ladgate Ward

Linthorpe Ward

Marton Ward

Marton West Ward

Middlehaven Ward

North Ormesby and Brambles Farm Ward

Nunthorpe Ward

Pallister Ward

Park Ward

Park End Ward

Stainton and Thornton Ward

Thorntree Ward

University Ward

References

2007 English local elections
2007
2000s in North Yorkshire